Stephen J. Fife  (born October 4, 1986) is an American former professional baseball pitcher. He played for the Major League Baseball (MLB) for the Los Angeles Dodgers and Saitama Seibu Lions of Nippon Professional Baseball (NPB).

Early years
Born and raised in Boise, Idaho, Fife was a member of Idaho's first-ever team at the Little League World Series in 1999. He graduated from Borah High School in 2005, where he led the Lions to the 5A state title in his senior season, their first since 1981. Fife was also a member of the American Legion Boise Senators, winners of the state title (AA) in 2004. He attended Everett Community College north of Seattle and transferred to the University of Utah in Salt Lake City, where he was a Mountain West Conference All-Star for the Utes. Following his junior season, Fife was selected by the Boston Red Sox in the 3rd round of the 2008 Major League Baseball draft.

Playing career

Boston Red Sox
Fife spent 2008 and 2009 in Class-A with the Lowell Spinners, Greenville Drive, and Salem Red Sox. In 2010, with the AA Portland Sea Dogs, he started 26 games and was 8-6 with a 4.75 ERA. He began 2011 with Portland, starting 18 games with an 11-4 record and 3.66 ERA.

Los Angeles Dodgers
On July 31, 2011, Fife was traded (along with Tim Federowicz) to the Los Angeles Dodgers in a three-team trade that sent Trayvon Robinson to the Seattle Mariners. In 6 starts with the Dodgers AA affiliate, the Chattanooga Lookouts, he was 3-1 with a 4.01 ERA. He was added to the 40-man roster after the season to protect him from the Rule 5 draft and promoted to the AAA Albuquerque Isotopes to start 2012.

Fife was called up to the majors for the first time on July 17, 2012 to make a spot start against the Philadelphia Phillies in place of the injured Chad Billingsley. He pitched six innings, allowing only one run while inducing 11 ground ball outs and left the game with the lead, only to get a no decision when the bullpen blew the game in the eighth. He was optioned back to the Isotopes after the game. After one start with the Isotopes, he returned to the Dodgers after Nathan Eovaldi was traded. He made two more starts with the Dodgers on July 27 and August 1 before returning to the minors after the team acquired Joe Blanton. In 24 starts (and 1 relief appearance) with the Isotopes, Fife was 11-7 with a 4.66 ERA. He was later recalled to the Dodgers in September and made two more starts. In his 5 total starts with the Dodgers in 2012, he was 0-2 with a 2.70 ERA.

Fife picked up his first career win on June 3, 2013, in a spot start against the San Diego Padres. He again split the season between Albuquerque and Los Angeles. With the Dodgers, he made 10 starts (and appeared in 2 games out of the bullpen) with a 4-4 record and 3.86 ERA.

In the 2014 season, he made one appearance for the Dodgers, starting a game on May 4 against the Miami Marlins. He allowed four runs in six innings in that game. He also started nine games for the Isotopes (and appeared in relief twice). He was 2-2 with a 7.01 ERA before going to the DL with a sore arm. On August 13, 2014, he underwent Tommy John surgery, ending his season. On October 13, 2014, he was outrighted to the minor leagues and removed from the 40 man roster.

Chicago Cubs 
On December 11, 2015 the Chicago Cubs signed Fife to a minor league contract. Fife spent the 2016 season with the Iowa Cubs, where he posted an 0-2 record with a 4.61 ERA.

Miami Marlins
On December 13, 2016, Fife signed a minor league contract with the Miami Marlins. He was released on June 16, 2017.

Saitama Seibu Lions
Fife signed with the Saitama Seibu Lions of Nippon Professional Baseball soon after his release from the Marlins.

Cleveland Indians
In February 2018, Fife signed a minor-league deal with the Cleveland Indians. He elected free agency on November 3, 2018.

Scouting report
Fife is an extreme groundball pitcher throughout his minor league and major league career.

References

External links

, or NPB
Utah Utes baseball – Stephen Fife
Everett Community College Athletics – Stephen Fife

1986 births
Living people
Águilas del Zulia players
American expatriate baseball players in Venezuela
Albuquerque Isotopes players
American expatriate baseball players in Japan
Arizona League Cubs players
Arizona League Dodgers players
Baseball players from Idaho
Chattanooga Lookouts players
Columbus Clippers players
Estrellas Orientales players
American expatriate baseball players in the Dominican Republic
Greenville Drive players
Iowa Cubs players
Los Angeles Dodgers players
Lowell Spinners players
Major League Baseball pitchers
New Orleans Baby Cakes players
Nippon Professional Baseball pitchers
Portland Sea Dogs players
Rancho Cucamonga Quakes players
Saitama Seibu Lions players
Salem Red Sox players
Salt River Rafters players
Utah Utes baseball players